Méry-sur-Oise (literally Méry on Oise) is a commune in the Val-d'Oise department in Île-de-France in northern France. Méry-sur-Oise station has rail connections to Persan, Saint-Leu-la-Forêt and Paris.

Population

See also
Communes of the Val-d'Oise department

References

External links

Official website 

Land use (IAURIF) 
Association of Mayors of the Val d'Oise 

Communes of Val-d'Oise